Homprenorphine (M-5202; R&S-5205-M) is an opioid analgesic of the thebaine series which was synthesized and assayed in 1967, but was not further studied and was never marketed.

See also 
 Buprenorphine

References 

Analgesics
4,5-Epoxymorphinans
Opioids
Tertiary alcohols